Halpen is a surname. Notable people with the surname include:

Klineman Halpen, fictional character from Doctor Who
Patrick Halpen, Irish engraver